Capiatá is a city in Central Department, Paraguay. 

It is the only city in Central that borders seven cities: Aregua, Itaugua, Juan Augusto Saldívar, Luque, Ñemby, San Lorenzo and Ypane.

It is the location of the Francisco López Military Academy.

Notable residents
Carlos Lara Bareiro, musician
Isidro Prieto, boxer

Populated places in the Central Department
Populated places established in 1728
1728 establishments in the Spanish Empire